Kapoeta South County is an administrative region in Eastern Equatoria State.
The county logo is a ram with horns and slightly bent tail.
The county includes the Kapoeta Town, Machi and Namorunyang Payams.

During the Second Sudanese Civil War (1983-2005) the Sudanese Armed Forces laid a Barrier Minefield around the town of Kapoeta. In a ceremony in July 2007 the Mines Advisory Group (MAG) declared a section of this land  in area free of mines and available for farming. MAG planned to continue mine clearance to provide access to grazing land and room for settlements. 

The town and county are served by Kapoeta Airport, a small single-runway facility.
The Kapoeta Mission Hospital in Longeleya Payam was established immediately after the Sudan People's Liberation Army (SPLA) took control in June 2002. The hospital has an estimated catchment population of 490,000, growing fast with the influx of returnees and IDPs (Internally Displaced People) and other attracted to the town for work or trade.

In June 2008 the Ambassador of the Kingdom of the Netherlands officially opened the office of the SNV (Netherlands Development Organization) in a ceremony attended by State Governor Brigadier General Aloisio Ojetuk Emor. SNV is dedicated to improving the capabilities of local government.
On 4 February 2011 the U.S. Consul General in Juba and Eastern Equatoria state Governor Louis Lobong Lojore formally opened an 894-kilowatt power plant in Kapoeta, built using funding from USAID.

References

Counties of Eastern Equatoria